This is a list of governors of Okayama Prefecture:
Igi Tadazumi 1871
Shinjō Atsunobu 1871-1873
Ishibe Seichū 1873-1875
Takasaki Goroku 1875-1884
Chisaka Takamasa 1886-1894
Kono Chuzo 1894-1897
Chikaaki Takasaki 1897-1900
Yoshihara Saburo 1900-1902
Higaki Naosuke 1902-1906
Terada Yushi 1906-1908
Taniguchi Tomegoro 1908-1911
Tsunamasa Ōyama 1911-1913
Masao Kishimoto 1927-1928
Minabe Choji 1928-1929
Hirokichi Nishioka 1947-1951
Yukiharu Miki 1951-1964
Takenori Kato 1964-1972
Shiro Nagano 1972-1996
Masahiro Ishii 1996-2012
Ryuta Ibaragi 2012–present

 
Okayama Prefecture